Jan Kodeš Jr. (born 11 March 1972) is a former professional tennis player from the Czech Republic.

Biography
Born in Prague, he is the son of Czech tennis great Jan Kodeš.

A highly rated junior in the late 1980s, at his peak he was the number two junior in Czechoslovakia, behind Martin Damm. It was with Damm that he made the boys doubles final at the 1989 US Open, which they lost to South Africans Wayne Ferreira and Grant Stafford. He was the Czechoslovak national junior champion in 1989.

Kodeš turned professional in 1990 and in his first year on tour made the second round at Prague, with a win over Cédric Pioline. In 1991 he defeated Thomas Enqvist to win the Prague Challenger. He won two further Challenger titles during his career, both in doubles. As a doubles player he twice made the semi-finals of ATP Tour tournaments, at Prague in 1993 and Ostrava in 1994, both beside Tomáš Anzari. He also competed in the main draw of the doubles at the 1995 French Open, with countryman Damm.

Challenger titles

Singles: (1)

Doubles: (2)

References

External links
 
 

1972 births
Living people
Czech male tennis players
Tennis players from Prague
Czechoslovak male tennis players